Pennard (previously Llanarthbodu) is a village and community on the south of the Gower Peninsula, about 7 miles south-west of Swansea city centre. It falls within the Pennard electoral ward of Swansea. The Pennard community includes the larger settlements of Southgate and Kittle. the population as of 2011 was 2,688.

Description and amenities
The village has a church, health centre, library and a primary school. There is also an 18-hole golf course, as well as the remains of a 12th-century castle.

Pennard Castle

To the west of Pennard village, overlooking the valley of Pennard Pill, is the 12th-century ruins of Pennard Castle. The castle was abandoned in the 14th-century due to encroachment from the sand dunes. It was described as "desolate and ruinous" by 1650 and today only the gatehouse and some of the curtain wall remain.

Pennard Golf Club
Pennard Golf Club is an 18-hole golf course known as the "links in the sky" due to its lofty views over the coast and Pennard Sand Dunes. Described variously as "intimidating" and only second in beauty to the Langland Bay Golf Club, the club invited golf architect Tom Doak to rebuild and redesign its bunkers in 2015.

St Mary's Church
The parish church of St Mary's, post dates an earlier medieval church of the same name which was located near Pennard Castle. The older church was abandoned in the 1500s and only the foundations remain. The newer church was restored in 1847 and a porch added. Inside the church there is a Jacobean pulpit and font cover, as well as some 18th-century wall tablets. The church became Grade II listed in 1964.

The poets Vernon Watkins (1906–1967), Harri Webb (1920–1994) and Nigel Jenkins (1949–2014) are buried in the churchyard. Watkins also has a memorial plaque inside the church.

A fine example of a restored medieval Gower Church, St Mary's is open all year during daylight hours. At night an illuminated cross shines out across the community. Services are held every Sunday.

Local politics
Pennard lies in the Gower parliamentary constituency and Senedd Cymru constituency. The Pennard ward elects a councillor to the City and County of Swansea Council.

The Pennard community (civil parish) includes the nearby villages of Southgate, Kittle, Sandylane, Cannisland and Langrove. It elects a Community council of fourteen members.  The council is divided into two ward areas, Southgate and Kittle, who return eleven and three councillors respectively. It made the Swansea news in 2013 when the chairman resigned after other councillors expressed concerns about the running of the council.

The community of Pennard is twinned with Passage West in the Republic of Ireland.

Further reading 

 Pennard and West Gower, Rev. Latimer Davies M.A., W. Spurrell & Son, 1928
 A History of Pennard Parish up to the Second Millennium, W. J. Harding, 2000, Southgate,

References

Villages in Swansea
 
Populated places on the Gower Peninsula
Populated coastal places in Wales